Desde Siempre (Since Ever) is the second compilation album by Puerto Rican singer Chayanne, which was released on March 29, 2005.

Album information
Unlike of his previous compilation album Grandes Éxitos, this album is a collection of Chayanne ballads with a new song "Contra Vientos y Mareas" by Franco De Vita.

Track listing
The track listing from Billboard.com

Music videos
Contra Vientos y Mareas

Personnel 

Alex Acuña – percussion, drum machine
Carlos Alvarez – mixing
Marcelo Anez – engineer
Tommy Anthony – backing vocals
Kevin Apple – stylist
Marcello Azevedo – acoustic guitar, bass, arranger, electric guitar, programming
Greg Bartheld – programming
Odisa Beltrán – production assistant
Manny Benito – vocal producer, vocal coach
Andres Bermudez – assistant engineer
Edwin Bonilla – percussion
Jorge Calandrelli – synthesizer, piano, arranger, producer
Alberto Carballo – graphic design
Jessica Chirino – backing vocals
Michael "Junno" Cosculluela – backing vocals
David Davidson – violin
Doug Emery – arranger, drum programming
Estéfano – producer
Ronnie Foster – arranger, producer
Mike Fuller – mastering
Iker Gastaminza – arranger, engineer, mixing
Julio Hernandez – bass
Richard Howell – assistant engineer
Paul Jackson Jr. – guitar
Max Kolibe – engineer
Abraham Laboriel – bass
Anthony LaMarchina – cello
Lee Levine – arranger, drums, programming
Roberto Livi – producer
John Lucas – backing vocals
Ricardo Eddy Martinez – arranger, producer
Chris McDonald – string arrangements
Miami Symphonic Orchestra – strings
Raul Midón – backing vocals
Joel Numa – engineer
Luis Fernando Ochoa – producer
Alfredo Oliva – concert master
Wendy Pedersen – backing vocals
Lena Pérez – backing vocals
Donato Póveda – producer
Julio C. Reyes – conductor, orchestration
Gustavo Sanchez – producer
Randy Singer – harmonica
Cesar Sogbe – engineer, mixing, vocal engineer
Rafael Solano – percussion
Rene Toledo – guitar, arranger, producer, vocal coach
Carlos Cats Valldejuli – production coordination
Mauricio Velez – photography
Dan Warner – electric guitar
James Warner – engineer
Bruce Weeden – mixing
Kristin Wilkinson – viola
Cristian Zalles – backing vocals

Charts

Sales and certifications

References

2005 compilation albums
Chayanne compilation albums
Spanish-language compilation albums